Life Without George was a BBC comedy series created and written by Penny Croft (Val Hudson also wrote part of some episodes). Starring Carol Royle and Simon Cadell, it centred on a young woman's struggle to adapt to life after being left by her partner (the titular George). The series ran from 12 March 1987 to 4 May 1989. The theme tune was written and performed by Penny Croft.

Cast
Jenny Russell – Carol Royle (Episodes 1–20)
Larry Wade- Simon Cadell (Episodes 1–20)
Mr Chambers – Ronald Fraser (Episodes 1–2,4–20)
Amanda – Rosalind March (Episodes 1–13) Elizabeth Estensen (Episodes 14–20)
Ben – Michael Thomas (Episodes 1–20)
Sammy – Kenny Ireland (Episodes 1–6) Campbell Morrison (Episodes 7,9–20)
Carol – Cheryl Maiker (Episodes 1, 4–20)
Alison – Ann Thornton (Episodes 2,9)
Dolores – Camille Coduri (Episode 4)
Barbara – Susan Crowly (Episode 4)
Alan – Aaran Harris (Episode 4)
David Knight – Harold Innocent (Episodes 10,11)
Gerald – Barry Woolgar (Episode 12, 13)
Josephine – Selina Cadell (Episode 14–20)

Screenings

Life After George was originally screened on BBC1 in the UK between 1987 and 1989. Each of the three series ran from March, with episodes released once a week; series 1 and 2 had six episodes each, series 3 had eight episodes. In the UK the entire show was repeated on UK GOLD twice weekly with a Tuesday night showing at 10.30pm and one around 11pm on Sundays.

References

External links 

1987 British television series debuts
1989 British television series endings
1980s British sitcoms
BBC television sitcoms
English-language television shows
Television shows set in Suffolk
1980s British romantic comedy television series